Aganisia pulchella is a species of orchid native to Trinidad, French Guiana, Suriname, Guyana, Venezuela, Brazil. It is the type species of the genus Aganisia.

References

External links 

photo of herbarium specimen at Missouri Botanical Garden, collected in Venezuela, Aganisia pulchella
IOSPE Orchid Species
La Chaussette rouge, Aganisia pulchella 

pulchella
Orchids of Brazil
Flora of Trinidad and Tobago
Orchids of French Guiana
Orchids of Suriname
Orchids of Guyana
Orchids of Venezuela
Plants described in 1839
Flora without expected TNC conservation status